Merry Christmas, Darling is the second studio album recorded by Nigerian singer Timi Dakolo. It was released by Virgin EMI Records on November 2, 2019 and co-produced by Dakolo and Humberto Gatica.

Production and recording 
The album was recorded in multiple locations including Abbey Road Studios, as well as Libreville, Budapest, Lagos and Los Angeles. It was executively produced by Ali Bongo Ondimba and Efe Ogbeni.

Merry Christmas, Darling is Dakolo's first Christmas album and features Emeli Sandé, Eric Benét, Kenny G, Laura Bretan and the Eben Voices of Gabon Choir.

Track listing

References 

2019 Christmas albums
Covers albums
Virgin EMI Records albums